William Michael Katrishen (May 7, 1922 – March 1980) was an American football guard in the National Football League for the Washington Redskins.  He played college football at the University of Southern Mississippi and was drafted in the tenth round of the 1948 NFL Draft.

References

1922 births
1980 deaths
American football offensive guards
Alabama Crimson Tide football players
Southern Miss Golden Eagles football players
Washington Redskins players
People from Hazleton, Pennsylvania
Players of American football from Pennsylvania